Ephrata Municipal Airport  is a public use airport located  southeast of the central business district of Ephrata, a city in Grant County, Washington, United States. It is included in the National Plan of Integrated Airport Systems for 2011–2015, which categorized it as a general aviation airport.

History 
The airfield was established in 1939 as Ephrata Army Air Base.  It was used initially as a support airfield for bombing and gunnery ranges in the area (Seven Mile Gunnery School).   Transferred to Fourth Air Force in 1940 as a group training airfield for B-17 Flying Fortress heavy bombardment units (including the 401st Bombardment Group), with new aircraft being obtained from Boeing near Seattle.  Later it was reassigned to Second Air Force when heavy bombardment group training was reassigned to that command. It was also used by Air Technical Service Command as an aircraft maintenance and supply depot. On 25 September 1945, Major General Willis H. Hale, Fourth Air Force, notified Ephrata Army Air Base that it was temporarily deactivated, and it was turned over to War Assets Administration (WAA) for disposal. It was transferred to Grant County and developed into a commercial airport in the late 1940s.

Parts of the 1989 Steven Spielberg film Always were filmed on the airport.

Facilities and aircraft 
Ephrata Municipal Airport covers an area of 2,300 acres (931 ha) at an elevation of 1,276 feet (389 m) above mean sea level. It has three asphalt paved runways: 3/21 is 5,500 by 75 feet (1,676 x 23 m); 4/22 is 3,467 by 150 feet (1,057 x 46 m); 11/29 is 3,843 by 60 feet (1,171 x 18 m).

For the 12-month period ending June 28, 2010, the airport had 135,140 general aviation aircraft operations, an average of 370 per day. At that time there were 72 aircraft based at this airport: 24% single-engine, 7% multi-engine, and 69% glider.

Cargo Carriers

See also 

 Washington World War II Army Airfields
 List of airports in Washington

References

External links
 Port of Ephrata: Port District #9 of Grant County, Washington
 WSDOT Pilot's Guide: 
 WSDOT Economic Impacts: 
 Aerial image as of July 1996 from USGS The National Map
 

Airports in Washington (state)
Transportation buildings and structures in Grant County, Washington
Airfields of the United States Army Air Forces in Washington (state)
Airports established in 1943
1943 establishments in Washington (state)